Han Hye-jin (born October 27, 1981) is a South Korean actress. Han made her breakthrough in 2005 when she starred as a young widow in her 20s working as an outgoing hairdresser in the hit daily drama Be Strong, Geum-soon!. Among her notable leading roles include Soseono in the historical epic Jumong, Korea's first female doctor of Western medicine in Jejungwon, and a sharpshooter in the manhwa film adaptation 26 Years. She also hosted the popular talk show Healing Camp, Aren't You Happy from 2011 to 2013.

Personal life 
Han dated singer Naul (from R&B group Brown Eyed Soul) from 2003 to 2012.

Han confirmed in March 2013 that she was dating South Korean midfielder Ki Sung-Yeung, and they announced their engagement two months later. Both are devout Christians. The couple married on July 1, 2013, at the Hotel Intercontinental Seoul. They have a daughter, born on September 13, 2015.

Filmography

Film

Television series

Television shows

Awards and nominations

References

External links 

1981 births
Living people
South Korean television actresses
South Korean film actresses
South Korean television presenters
South Korean women television presenters
Seoul Institute of the Arts alumni
South Korean Christians